The Gloucester and Sharpness Canal (also known as the Gloucester and Berkeley Canal) is a ship canal in the west of England, between Gloucester and Sharpness; for much of its length it runs close to the  tidal River Severn, but cuts off a significant loop in the river, at a once-dangerous bend near Arlingham. It was once the broadest and deepest canal in the world.

Canal planning and construction
Conceived in the canal mania period of the late 18th century, the Gloucester and Berkeley Ship Canal scheme (as it was originally named) was started by architect and civil engineer Robert Mylne. In 1793 an Act of Parliament was obtained authorising the raising of a total of £200,000. The project rapidly encountered financial difficulties – to such an extent that Mylne left the project in 1798.

By mid-1799 costs had reached £112,000 but only  of the canal had been completed. Robert Mylne's role was taken over by James Dadford who had originally been engaged as resident engineer on the project in 1795. Lack of funds resulted in the company ceasing to employ Dadford in 1800.

Decade of capital raising
Between 1800 and 1810 various attempts were made to raise money to allow further building but they came to nothing. Money from tolls and rents allowed for some improvements to be made to the basin at Gloucester in 1813.

Eventual completion
From 1817 onwards the Poor Employment Act meant it was possible for the company to borrow money from the Exchequer Bill Loan Commission. This along with further share issues provided enough money to bring the scheme to completion. After these significant delays, the canal opened in April 1827. In the course of its construction the canal had cost £440,000.

Eventual dividends

By the middle of the 19th century it proved possible to pay a small dividend, the debt to the Exchequer Bill Loan Commission having been repaid with the help of a loan of £60,000 from the Pelican Life Assurance Company.  In 1871 the last of the debts incurred in the course of funding the canal including the Pelican loan were paid off. Where the Severn Railway Bridge (completed in 1879) passed over the canal, a swing section was constructed to avoid restricting headroom.

Purton hulks

In 1909, following a collapse in the bank of the river, the canal company's chief engineer A. J. Cullis called for old vessels to be run aground along the bank of the Severn, near Purton, to create a makeshift tidal erosion barrier to reinforce the narrow strip of land between the river and canal. Barges, trows and schooners were "hulked" at high tide, and have since filled with silt.  More boats have been added, including the schooner Katherine Ellen which was impounded in 1921 for running guns to the IRA, the Kennet barge Harriett, and ferrocement barges built in World War II.

In 1999 Paul Barnett started a privately funded research project to record the 81 vessels at the site, recognised as the largest ships' graveyard in mainland Britain. In 2010 British Waterways took control of the site in an attempt to protect it.

Bridge-houses

Eight of the bridges have Neo-classical bridge-men's houses in the near vicinity. These were built in the early Nineteenth Century when the volume of traffic on the canal made it important that all the bridges could open at night so that vessels could meet the tides at Sharpness. At that time, the other bridge-men lived in existing houses that were close enough to their bridges.
The classical-style bridge-men's houses were originally symmetrical in plan with gables on each elevation. Each had a living room, one bedroom, a scullery at the back and a porch with Doric columns at the front. In later years, the houses have been extended to provide more accommodation and modern facilities. Today, the houses are in private ownership, mostly Grade II listed.

Modern times
In 1905 traffic exceeded one million tons for the first time. Oil was added to the list of cargoes carried by the canal, with bulk oil carriers taking fuel to storage tanks sited to the south of Gloucester. The canal was nationalized in 1948. At the same time the Sharpness Dock Police which had policed the dock since 1874 were absorbed into the British Transport Police.

In 1955 the Board of Survey of Canals and Inland Waterways released a report that, among other things, described the Gloucester and Sharpness Canal as carrying substantial traffic and offering scope for commercial development.

The River Cam, which is subject to accretion due to industrial and agricultural runoff, is an important feeder for the Gloucester and Sharpness Canal. It was formerly navigable as the Cambridge Arm with one entrance lock leading to a basin and wharf at Cambridge, the limit of navigation due to mill weirs and low bridges on the Bristol to Gloucester road. The lock was missing and the basin abandoned by 1901. Most of the straightened channel has survived as flood defence improvements and is potentially still navigable, but the entrance is now blocked by a very low bridge at the site of the former lock.

By the mid-1980s commercial traffic had largely come to a halt with the canal being given over to pleasure cruisers with the exception of a few passages by grain barges. The oil trade ceased in 1985 with the closure of the petroleum depot at Quedgeley. In order to allow the A430 Gloucester southwestern bypass to be built the canal had to be diverted.  This new cut eliminated a major problem which had plagued commercial traffic since opening: the sharp double bend in the canal.  The new section of channel was opened on 6 May 2006. In January 2009 a project began to replace the Patch Bridge swing bridge with a motor powered design instead of the former hand-cranked system.

The canal links directly to the Stroudwater Navigation at Saul Junction, the only such flat crossing between two different canal companies anywhere in the world.

See also

Canals of the United Kingdom
History of the British canal system

References

Bibliography

External links

Gloucester Docks and the Sharpness Canal Past, Present and Future
some OS Bench Marks to be seen along the Gloucester & Sharpness Canal
images & map of mile pegs (milestones) seen along the Gloucester & Sharpness canal
 Stroud Voices (of local canals) - oral history site

Canals linked to the River Severn
Canals in England
Canal
Stroud District
Canals in Gloucestershire
Works of Thomas Telford
Canals opened in 1827
CGloucester
1827 establishments in England
Gloucester Docks